Ramnagar is a town and a notified area in Pashchim Champaran district in the Indian state of Bihar. Ramnagar is situated on the border of India-Nepal and Bihar - Uttar Pradesh.

Demographics

, India census, Ramnagar had a population of 249,102 . Males constitute 51.95% of the population and females 48.05%. Ramnagar has an average literacy rate of 55.43%., lower than the national average of 59.5% : The male literacy rate is 52.83% and the female literacy rate is 36.15% in Ramnagar Block. 19% of the population is under 6 years of age.
As per Census 2011 out of total population, 19.4% people lives in Urban areas while 80.6% lives in the Rural areas. The average literacy rate in urban areas is 66.4% while that in the rural areas is 52.7%. Also the Sex Ratio of Urban areas in Ramnagar Block is 907 while that of Rural areas is 929.

About
 Governing body                : Municipal council
 Famous for                    : Shiv mandir
 Industry established          : Harinagar sugar mill Pvt Ltd.
 Environment                   : Fresh and clean
 Atmosphere                    : Clean air and green surrounding
 Schools locate here           : Ramnagar central school, Rajhansh public school, St.Xavier's, Friend's academy Etc.
 Near to                       : Valmikinagar

Religion-wise Population  Ramnagar

Urban/Rural Population - Ramnagar

As per Census 2011, there are total 9,123 families under Ramnagar Block living in urban areas while 9,123 families are living within Rural areas. Thus around 19.4% of total population of Ramnagar Block lives in Urban areas while 80.6% lives under Rural areas. Population of children (0 – 6 years) in urban region is 8,146 while that in rural region is 39,558.

Working Population - Ramnagar

In Ramnagar Block out of total population, 97,049 were engaged in work activities. 64.1% of workers describe their work as Main Work (Employment or Earning more than 6 Months) while 35.9% were involved in Marginal activity providing livelihood for less than 6 months. Of 97,049 workers engaged in Main Work, 9,933 were cultivators (owner or co-owner) while 38,972 were Agricultural labourer.

Tourism 
 Raj Shiv Mandir is a temple in the area
 Sumeswer Fort is situated on the summit of the Sumeswer hills, at a height of 2,884 feet above sea level, in Ramnagar block. The fort which stands on the edge of a sharp precipice, is now in ruins, but its remains are well defined and reservoirs cut out of the solid rocks, in which water was stored for the use of the inhabitants, can still be seen. From the ridge upon which Fort Sumeswer is situated here are views of the intervening valleys and low hills of Nepal. The ridge here forms the boundary between West Champaran and Nepal. The Himalayan peaks of Dhoulagiri, Gosainthan and Gaurishanker are all visible.

Place to know in Ramnagar

Chitragupt Mandir

Chitragupta (Sanskrit: चित्रगुप्त, 'rich in secrets' or 'hidden picture') is a Hindu god assigned with the task of keeping complete records of actions of human beings on the earth and punish or reward them according to their Karmas. He is god of justice therefore known as Dharmaraja. Upon their death, Chitragupta has the task of deciding heaven or the hell for the humans, depending on their actions on the earth. Chitragupta Maharaj is the seventeenth Manasputra of Lord Brahma and thus, allotted the right to write Vedas like Brahmins with the duty of a Kshatriya (Chitragupta is the patron deity of Kayasthas, a Hindu caste of India and Nepal), because of which Chitraguptavanshi Kayasthas are considered as Vedic Suryavanshi Brahmakshatriyas. Chitragupta is god of Kayasth.

Location : Near Busstand ,
Chitragupt mandir 

.........................................................................................................................................................

Nature

As described above the Nature in Ramnagar is just Awesome..Here u can see.

Climate
The climate of Ramnagar is shown in the chart below. The temperature doesn't remain constant all the year as per chart but follows the climate changes throughout the year Ramnagar weather

References

Cities and towns in West Champaran district